The British twenty pound (£20) coin is a commemorative denomination of sterling coinage, first issued by the Royal Mint in 2013. It is minted in .999 fine silver. Twenty pound coins are legal tender but are intended as souvenirs and are almost never seen in general circulation.

Design
The designs which have appeared on the twenty pound coin's reverse are summarised in the table below.

Welsh Dragon £20 
From 2016-2020 the royal mint has produced a Welsh Dragon £20 on a backdrop of the Visitor centre at the Royal mint experience. Some of these years have been accompanied by the same coin on a backdrop of the Welsh flag. The Visitor centre coin could only be purchased at the shop.

Legal tender status 
The prolific issuance since 2013 of silver commemorative £20, £50 and £100 coins at face value has led to attempts to spend or deposit these coins,
prompting the Royal Mint to clarify the legal tender status of these silver coins.

Royal Mint guidelines advise that, although these coins were approved as legal tender, they are considered limited edition collectables not intended for general circulation.

References

External links

Royal Mint – £20 coin 

Coins of the United Kingdom
Twenty-base-unit coins